Neot Smadar (lit. Oasis of blossoming vines) is a kibbutz in southern Israel. Located in the Arava Desert, it falls under the jurisdiction of Hevel Eilot Regional Council. Its area is 80 hectares.

History
Neot Smadar is located in the southern Negev  about 70 km. north of  Eilat. The kibbutz was established in 1989, on the grounds of an abandoned kibbutz, Shizafon. Neot Smadar is as an organic community featuring architecturally unique buildings with passive cooling towers. The Art Center houses 14 workshops for Stained glass, ceramics, textile, wood and metals. The building is insulated with mud bricks, with "air conditioning" supplied by a desert cooling tower.

Economy
The economy is based on agriculture, with  500 dunams of organically cultivated vineyards (origin of the place name), deciduous trees, olives, date plantations and an herb garden. Olive oil is produced in a cold press set up with assistance from ICA and Israel's Ministry of Industry and Trade in 2001. The high-quality oil has been conferred the highest grade by Israel's Olive Council. 

The kibbutz operates a boutique organic winery and produces a variety of cheeses from fresh goat milk. Its roadside restaurant, Pundak Neot Smadar, offers vegetarian food and sells the kibbutz's organic products.

References

External links
Official website 
http://neot-semadar.com/?lang=en English

Kibbutzim
Kibbutz Movement
Populated places established in 1989
Populated places in Southern District (Israel)
1989 establishments in Israel